Area code 661 is a California telephone area code that covers the majority of Kern County, as well as part of Los Angeles County, Santa Barbara County, and Tulare County. It was split from area code 805 on February 13, 1999.

Principal cities in the 661 area code are Bakersfield, Palmdale, Santa Clarita, and Lancaster.

Places in the 661 area code

Kern County

Arvin
Bakersfield
Bear Valley Springs
Buttonwillow
Caliente
Delano
Edwards Air Force Base
Famoso
Fellows
Frazier Park
Golden Hills
Grapevine
Havilah
Keene
Lake of the Woods
Lamont
Lebec
Lost Hills
Maricopa
McFarland
McKittrick
Mettler
Mojave
North Edwards
Oildale
Pine Mountain Club
Rosamond
Rosedale
Shafter
South Taft
Stallion Springs
Taft
Taft Heights
Tehachapi
Tupman
Valley Acres
Walker Basin
Wasco
Weedpatch
Wheeler Ridge

Los Angeles County

Acton
Agua Dulce
Antelope Acres
Castaic
Del Sur
Desert View Highlands
Gorman
Green Valley
Juniper Hills
Lake Hughes
Lake Los Angeles
Lancaster
Leona Valley
Littlerock
Llano
Neenach
Palmdale
Pearblossom
Quartz Hill
Santa Clarita
Stevenson Ranch
Valencia
Val Verde
Valyermo

Santa Barbara County

Cuyama
New Cuyama

Tulare County

Allensworth
Earlimart
Posey

See also
List of California area codes
List of NANP area codes
North American Numbering Plan

References

External links

661
Kern County, California
Los Angeles County, California
Santa Barbara County, California
Tulare County, California
Mojave Desert
San Joaquin Valley
Bakersfield, California
Lancaster, California
Palmdale, California
Santa Clarita, California
661